Rudolf IV (1 November 1339 – 27 July 1365), also called Rudolf the Founder, was a scion of the House of Habsburg who ruled as duke of Austria (self-proclaimed archduke), Styria and Carinthia from 1358, as well as count of Tyrol from 1363 and as the first duke of Carniola from 1364 until his death. After the Habsburgs received nothing from the decree of the Golden Bull in 1356, he gave order to draw up the "Privilegium Maius", a fake document to empower the Austrian rulers.

Early life
Born in Vienna, Rudolf was the eldest son of Duke Albert II of Austria and Joanna of Pfirt. One of the third generation of Habsburg dukes in Austria, he was the first to be born within the duchy. Therefore, he considered Austria his home, a sentiment that no doubt communicated itself to his subjects and contributed to his popularity. Faced with the Habsburgs' loss of the Imperial crown upon the assassination of his grandfather King Albert I of Germany in 1308, Rudolf was one of the most energetic and active rulers of Austria in the late Middle Ages, and it was said of him that as a young man he already had the air of a king.

Rule 
In 1357 he was married to Catherine of Bohemia, daughter of Emperor Charles IV. Eager to compete with his mighty father-in-law, who had made the Kingdom of Bohemia and its capital Prague a radiant center of Imperial culture, Rudolf desired to raise the importance of his residence Vienna to a comparable or greater height.
For more than a century, the Habsburg dukes had chafed at the popes' failure to make Vienna the seat of its own diocese, a status that they considered appropriate for the capital of a duchy. Instead the city parish was subordinate to the bishops of Passau, who had excellent connections to the pope, apparently dooming Vienna's prospects in this regard. Rudolf, however, resorted to something which could be considered imposture: He initiated the creation of a "metropolitan  cathedral chapter" at the church of St. Stephen (which, according to the name, should be assigned to a bishop), whose members wore red garments as cardinals do. The provost of the chapter received the title of an "archchancellor of Austria".

Rudolf extended St. Stephen's Cathedral, with the construction of its gothic nave being started under Rudolf's rule. The construction efforts can be seen as an attempt to compete with St. Vitus Cathedral in Prague. Rudolf had himself and his wife depicted on a cenotaph at the cathedral's entrance.

Similarly, by founding the University of Vienna in 1365, Rudolf sought to match Charles IV's founding of the Charles University of Prague in 1348. Still known as Alma Mater Rudolphina today, the University of Vienna is the oldest continuously operating university in the German-speaking world. However, a faculty of theology, which was considered crucial for a university at that time, was not established until 1385, twenty years after Rudolf's death.

To improve the economy of Vienna, Rudolf introduced many other measures, including the supervision by the mayor of sales of real property, instituted to prevent sales to the dead hand, i.e., to prevent economically unproductive ownership by the Church. Rudolf also managed to establish a relatively stable currency, the so-called Wiener Pfennig (Vienna Penny).

Rudolf is best known for another bluff, the forgery of the Privilegium Maius, which de facto put him on par with the seven Prince-electors of the Holy Roman Empire, compensating for Austria's failure to receive an electoral vote in the Golden Bull of 1356 issued by Emperor Charles IV. The title of Archduke (Erzherzog), invented by Rudolf, became an honorific title of all males of the House of Habsburg from the 16th century.

In 1363, Rudolf entered into a contract of inheritance with Countess Margaret of Gorizia-Tyrol upon the death of her only son, Meinhard III. The County of Tyrol came under Austrian rule after her death in 1369 since Margraret's brother-in-law Duke Stephen II of Bavaria had invaded the country. In 1364, Rudolf declared the Carinthian March of Carniola a duchy and the next year established the town of Novo Mesto in the Windic March (in what would later be known as Lower Carniola, in present-day Slovenia), whose German name Rudolfswert was given in his honor. In the same time, he concluded another contract of inheritance with his father-in-law Emperor Charles IV, providing for mutual inheritance between the Habsburg and Luxembourg dynasties.

Death 
In spite of the high-flying and sometimes megalomaniac  character of his plans, he managed to modernize his territories and his city, the prominence of which considerably increased. Rudolf died suddenly at Milan in 1365 aged 25. His and his wife's mortal remains are buried at the Ducal Crypt underneath the Stephansdom in Vienna.

His untimely death without issue halted further progress, however. His younger brothers Albert III and Leopold III, who were to rule jointly under the Rudolfinische Hausordnung (Rudolfinian House Rules), began to quarrel ceaselessly and ultimately agreed to divide the Habsburg territories between them according to the 1379 Treaty of Neuberg. It was Leopold's descendant Frederick V of Austria, elected King of the Romans in 1440 and sole ruler over all Austrian lands from 1457, who reaped the fruit of Rudolf's efforts and laid the foundations of the Habsburg monarchy.

Ancestry

References

Further reading
 
 
 
 
 Wilhelm Baum: Rudolf IV. der Stifter. Seine Welt und seine Zeit. Styria, Graz, 1996,

External links

Website of the Museum of the Roman Catholic Archdiocese of Vienna

Rudolf 4 of Austria
Rudolf 4 of Austria
14th-century dukes of Austria
Rudolf 4
Rudolf 4
Rudolf 4
Dukes of Carniola
Burials at St. Stephen's Cathedral, Vienna